|}

The Oaks Trial Stakes is a Listed flat horse race in Great Britain open to three-year-old fillies. It is run over a distance of 1 mile, 3 furlongs and 133 yards at Lingfield Park in May.

History
The event serves as a trial for the Epsom Oaks. Prior to World War II, it was called the Oaks Trial Plate. It became the Oaks Trial Stakes after the war.

The left-handed track at Lingfield Park is similar to that at Epsom. It has an undulating, cambered terrain with a sharp downhill turn into the home straight.

The Oaks Trial Stakes was formerly contested over 1 mile and 4 furlongs. It held Group 3 status from 1971 to 1985, and was relegated to Listed level in 1986. It was cut to its present distance in 1990.

Several contenders have subsequently won the Oaks. The most recent was Anapurna, the winner in 2019.

Records

Leading jockey since 1960 (6 wins):
 Pat Eddery – Suni (1978), Out of Shot (1984), Bahamian (1988), Asterita (1995), Lady Carla (1996), Santa Sophia (2003)

Leading trainer since 1960 (7 wins):
 Henry Cecil – Tants (1982), Mill on the Floss (1986), Rafha (1990), Lady Carla (1996), Ramruma (1999), Double Crossed (2001), Midday (2009)

Winners since 1971

Earlier winners

 1933: Look Alive
 1934: Shining Cloud
 1935: Milldoria
 1936: Miss Windsor
 1937: Ruby Red
 1938: Night Bird
 1939: Foxcraft
 1940–45: no race
 1946: Iona
 1947: Solpax
 1948: Angelola
 1949: Squall
 1950: Stella Polaris
 1951: Chinese Cracker
 1952: Zabara
 1953: Nectarine
 1954: Angel Bright
 1955: Ark Royal
 1956: No Pretender
 1957: Crotchet
 1958: None Nicer
 1959: Mirnaya
 1960: Running Blue
 1961: Impudent
 1962: Nortia
 1963: Amicable
 1964: Beaufront
 1965: Quita
 1966: Varinia
 1967: Javata
 1968: Our Ruby
 1969: Sleeping Partner
 1970: Pulchra

See also
 Horse racing in Great Britain
 List of British flat horse races

References

 Paris-Turf:
 Racing Post:

 galopp-sieger.de – Lingfield Oaks Trial Stakes.
 pedigreequery.com – Lingfield Oaks Trial Stakes – Lingfield Park.

Flat horse races for three-year-old fillies
Lingfield Park Racecourse
Flat races in Great Britain